Joe Keyes may refer to:
 Joe Keyes (musician)
 Joe Keyes (rugby league)